Christian persecution complex is the belief, attitude, or world view that Christian values and Christians are being oppressed by social groups and governments in the West. This belief is promoted by certain American Protestant churches, and some Christian- or Bible-based groups in Europe. It has been called the "Evangelical", "American Christian" or "Christian right" persecution complex.

Early Christianity

According to New Testament scholar Candida Moss the Christian "persecution complex" appeared during the era of early Christianity due to internal Christian identity politics.<ref>: Indeed, a recent study by Candida Moss, The Myth of Persecution has suggested that Christian "persecution complex" was the result of internal Christian identity politics</ref> Moss suggested that the idea of persecution is cardinal to the worldview of Christianity, noting that it creates the impression that Christians are a minority that are facing a war – even though they are numerically superior. This perception is grounded in the manichaeistic belief that the world is divided into two factions, one led by God and the other by Satan. In this view there can be no compromise between the two, and even attempting to dialogue or engage with "the other" is seen as a form of collaboration with it. Medieval historian Paul Cavill argues that the New Testament teaches that persecutions are inherent to Christianity.

 20th and 21st centuries 
Many find it difficult to define the origin of the Christian persecution complex. According to Elizabeth Castelli, some set the starting point in the middle of the 20th century, following a series of court rulings that declared public places to be out of bounds for religious activity (e.g. state-sanctioned morning prayer in schools). However, it became apparent in the United States in the 1990s with the adoption of the International Religious Freedom Act of 1998 as the official foreign policy. A few years later, the September 11 attacks boosted its development. This complex "mobilizes the language of religious persecution to shut down political debate and critique by characterizing any position not in alignment with this politicized version of Christianity as an example of anti-religious bigotry and persecution. Moreover, it routinely deploys the archetypal figure of the martyr as a source of unquestioned religious and political authority".

The concept that Christianity is being oppressed is popular among conservative politicians in contemporary politics in the United States, and they use this idea to address issues concerning LGBT people or the Affordable Care Act's contraceptive mandate, which they perceive as an attack on Christianity. The application of the contraceptive mandate to closely held corporations with religious objections was struck down by the Supreme Court in Burwell v. Hobby Lobby Stores, Inc.Hornback notes that the Christian persecution complex is widespread among nationalists in Europe, who feel that they are defending the continent from a new Islamic invasion. Francesca Stavrakopoulou explains that the advances of secularism, such as dropping catechism from publicly funded schools, is perceived by some Christians as persecution.

Christian persecution complex has an impact on popular culture, with films which "imagine embattled Christians prevailing against entrenched secularist opposition". David Ehrlich, a film critic, describes how the persecution complex is fueled by films and media such as the God's Not Dead saga.

In a conversation at the British Humanist Congress in 2014, Stavrakopoulou suggested that some Christian fundamentalists perceive the advancement of secularism as a threat, and that this may support the idea of a persecution complex.

Some contemporary white nationalists promote a narrative of Western persecution of Christians, arguing that they, rather than minority or immigrant populations, are most often attacked and marginalized.

Some Christian journalists point out that "American Christians have a persecution complex", while noting that the persecution of Christians is real in the Middle East.

See also
Alliance Defending FreedomGod's Not DeadPersecution of ChristiansRosenberger v. University of VirginiaTown of Greece v. Galloway''
Victim mentality
Victim playing
White genocide conspiracy theory

References

Bibliography

 
 
 
 
 
 
 
 
 
 
 
 
 

20th-century Christianity
21st-century Christianity
Christianity and politics in the United States
Christianity-related controversies
Conservatism in the United States
Freedom of religion in the United States
Early Christianity
Historiography of Christianity
Persecution of Christians
Psychology of religion
Religious discrimination in the United States
Secularism in the United States
Sociology of religion
Victimology